Space Cowboy may refer to:

People
 Space Cowboy (performer) (born 1978), an Australian performance artist
 Space Cowboy (musician), stage name for Nick Dresti, an electronic music producer and performer
 Spacecowboy, a South Korean composer, record producer, singer and songwriter, who is a member of OnePiece

Music
 "Space Cowboy", a song by the Steve Miller Band from the 1969 album Brave New World
 "The Joker", a song by the Steve Miller Band, often mistakenly called "Space Cowboy"
 "Space Cowboy" (Banaroo song), from the album Banaroo's World
 "Space Cowboy", a song from the Jonzun Crew album Lost in Space
 "Space Cowboy", a song from the 1997 Savage album Babylon
 "Space Cowboy", a song from the 2000 'N Sync album No Strings Attached
 "Space Cowboy", a song from the 2000 Scooter album Sheffield
 "Space Cowboy", a song from the 2012 album "Eye of the Hurricane" by Ilse DeLange
 "Space Cowboy" (Jamiroquai song), appearing on the Jamiroquai album The Return of the Space Cowboy
 "Space Cowboy", a song from the Abney Park album The End of Days
 "Space Cowboy" (Kacey Musgraves song), from the album Golden Hour
 "Space Cowboy", a song from the 2021 ZillaKami album DOG BOY

Other uses
Sugar Land Space Cowboys, the Triple-A affiliate of the Houston Astros in Minor League Baseball
 Space Cowboy (video game), a 1984 video game from Avalon Hill
 Space Cowboy Online, alternative name in North America for the role playing game Ace Online
 "The Space Cowboy", a character in the Stephen King novel Gerald's Game
"Deep Space Cowboys" is a term used in the Stephen King novel Lisey's Story
 George Peppard's character in Battle Beyond The Stars
 The phrase "see you space cowboy" at the end of nearly every episode of the anime series Cowboy Bebop
 Paulson, an Old West cowboy abducted by aliens in the Mothership Zeta add-on for Fallout 3

See also
 Space Cowboys, 2000 Clint Eastwood film
 "Spaced Cowboy", a song by Sly and the Family Stone from the 1971 LP There's a Riot Goin' On
 Space Western, a genre often incorporating cowboys in outer space
 Space pirates, often depicted as gunslingers rather than swordfighters